SMS S21 refers to two torpedo boats built by the German  (Imperial Navy):

, a  launched in 1885 and sunk in an accidental collision in 1911
, a  launched in 1913 and sunk in an accidental collision in 1915

German Navy ship names